Ygnacio Sepulveda (1842–1916) was a Californio judge and attorney, who served as part of the first Superior Court of Los Angeles County.

Family and education

Ygnacio Sepúlveda, a member of the prominent Sepúlveda family of California, was born on July 1, 1842 in the Pueblo de Los Ángeles, Alta California, Mexico. He was the son of Jose Andres Sepúlveda, grantee of Rancho San Joaquin in present day Orange County, and Francisca Avila. His grandfather was Francisco Sepúlveda II, the grantee of Rancho San Vicente in present day Los Angeles County. His early boyhood was spent in Los Angeles, but when older he was sent to prep schools in Boston, Massachusetts.

He was married on December 13, 1883, to Herlinda de la Guerra of Santa Barbara, California. He and his wife, who died in 1920, had two daughters, Conchita Sepúlveda Chapman Pignatelli and Ora Sepúlveda. He had two sisters, Mrs. Thomas D. Mott and Tranquilina Sepúlveda.

Legal career

California
Sepúlveda was admitted to the California State Bar in 1860 or 1863 and, as a Democrat, he served one term in the California Legislature (1863–65). He was elected a county judge in 1863 or 1869 and a district judge in 1874 or 1875. He became one of the first two Superior Court judges for Los Angeles County in 1879,  the other being Volney E. Howard. In 1872, he was a member of the first governing board for the Los Angeles Public Library system.

Mexico

In December 1883 Sepúlveda left Los Angeles and moved to Mexico City, where he spent thirty years practicing law and became the administrator of jurisprudence and legislation under the administration of President Porfirio Diaz of Mexico. In 1895 he was made the first secretary and chargé d'affaires of the United States in Mexico. While in  that country, in 1905 he helped organize the Guadalupe Council of the Knights of Columbus.

In 1895 Sepúlveda was elected a member of the Mexican Academy of Jurisprudence and Legislation.

Return

He returned to Los Angeles in 1914, with his wife and one daughter, to find a city greatly changed. He told a reporter that:

I am constantly comparing myself to Rip Van Winkle, and there is a certain sadness in this coming back after thirty years. With the exception of a flying visit six years ago, I have not seen my old home in all that time. ... The disturbed conditions in Mexico were large factors in my decision to give up our home in that country.

Death

Sepúlveda died at the age of 74 on December 2, 1916, in his home at 2639 Monmouth Avenue in today's University Park district. A requiem mass was celebrated on December 5 at Saint Agnes Church, Vermont Avenue and West Adams Street, and interment followed at Santa Barbara
Mission Cemetery in Santa Barbara, CA.

Legacy

In 2006, Sepúlveda's was one of the first names placed on a Wall of Fame sponsored by the Los Angeles County Bar Association.

References

Lawyers from Los Angeles
19th-century Mexican lawyers
Politicians from Los Angeles
1842 births
1916 deaths
California Democrats
People of Alta California
People from Mexico City
People from South Los Angeles
19th-century American politicians
Superior court judges in the United States
19th-century American judges
20th-century Mexican lawyers